Cai Cai Camp (also known as Cai Cai Special Forces Camp or Dan Chu Camp) is a former U.S. Army and Army of the Republic of Vietnam (ARVN) base northwest of Bình Thạnh Đông on the Plain of Reeds in southern Vietnam.

History
The base was established by the 5th Special Forces Group Detachment A-412 in April 1965 30 km northwest of Bình Thạnh Đông and 3 km from the Cambodian border.

The camp was frequently a target for Vietcong fire and was severely damaged by flooding in 1965 and 1966. In 1967 Detachment A-412 was redesignated as Detachment A-431.

On 18 January 1968 forces from Detachment A-431 engaged a Vietcong force near the camp and SGT Gordon Douglas Yntema would be posthumously awarded the Medal of Honor for his actions during the battle.

The base was handed over to the ARVN 76th Border Rangers in September 1970.

Current use
The base has been turned over to farmland and housing.

References

External links
 Video of Cai Cai Camp in 1966

Installations of the United States Army in South Vietnam
Installations of the Army of the Republic of Vietnam
Buildings and structures in Đồng Tháp province